Blyth Hall is a privately owned mansion house on the banks of the River Blythe situated near Shustoke, Warwickshire. It is a Grade I listed building.

The estate was purchased in 1625 by Sir William Dugdale, a prominent antiquarian, who shortly thereafter built himself a new house on the site. In about 1690–1700 the house was substantially enlarged and improved with a twelve-bay brick façade with two storeys and additional upper dormers.

In the 18th century Jane Dugdale, sole heiress of Blyth, married Richard Geast of Handsworth. Their son, also Richard Geast, married Penelope Stratford, heiress of neighbouring Merivale Hall in 1767. He inherited Blyth from his maternal uncle John Dugdale and changed his name to Dugdale in 1799.

Later Dugdales became Dugdale baronets of Blyth and Merevale. The Dugdale family is still in residence at Blyth Hall, which is not open to the public.

References
    Warwickshire Museum Timetrail
 Burkes Genealogical and Heraldic History of the Landed Gentry (Bernard Burke)

Country houses in Warwickshire
Grade I listed buildings in Warwickshire
Borough of North Warwickshire